Mestervik Chapel is a chapel of the Church of Norway in Balsfjord Municipality in Troms og Finnmark county, Norway. It is located in the village of Mestervik. It is an annex chapel for the Malangen parish which is part of the Senja prosti (deanery) in the Diocese of Nord-Hålogaland. The white, wooden chapel was originally a school and it was rebuilt in a long church design in 1968 using plans drawn up by the architect Kjell Hansen. The church seats about 100 people.

Media gallery

See also
List of churches in Nord-Hålogaland

References

Balsfjord
Churches in Troms
Wooden churches in Norway
20th-century Church of Norway church buildings
Churches completed in 1968
1968 establishments in Norway
Long churches in Norway